Peng Jingtang is a major general in the People's Liberation Army who is the current commander of the PLA Hong Kong Garrison, in office since January 2022.

Biography
Peng served in the Jinan Military Region, chief of staff of the Xinjiang Armed Police Corps, and deputy chief of staff of the People's Armed Police. He was promoted to the rank of major general (shaojiang) on 29 July 2018. On 9 January 2022, he was commissioned as commander of the PLA Hong Kong Garrison, succeeding Chen Daoxiang.

References

Living people
People's Liberation Army generals
Commanders of the People's Liberation Army Hong Kong garrison
Year of birth missing (living people)